Penamaluru is a Locality of Vijayawada in Krishna district of the Indian state of Andhra Pradesh. It is the mandal headquarters of Penamaluru mandal . As per the G.O. No. M.S.104 (dated:23-03-2017), Municipal Administration and Urban  Department, it became a part of vijayawada metropolitan area.

Transport
Bus numbers to go to Vijayawada Bus Station and Railway station from Penamaluru are 10, 10K and 23H.  We can get Bus Nos.333 and 222 from Penamaluru Center to go to Vijayawada Railway Station.

Etymology 
The village got its name by Pinamalleswarudu and previously known as Mathab Ka Penamaluru.

Government and politics 
Penamaluru is represented by Penamaluru (Assembly constituency) for Andhra Pradesh Legislative Assembly. Kolusu Parthasarathy is the present MLA of the constituency representing YSRCP Party.

See also 
Villages in Penamaluru mandal

References 

Neighbourhoods in Vijayawada
Mandal headquarters in Krishna district